Bernard Punsly (July 11, 1923 – January 20, 2004) was an American actor who later left show business to become a physician.

His last name was often spelled incorrectly in film credits as Punsley.

Early life and acting career
Punsly was born on July 11, 1923, in New York City.  In 1935, he auditioned for a part in the play Dead End, because he thought it might be fun. The success of the play led to a number of its child actors being cast in a 1937 film adaptation, Dead End, including Punsly. Its success led to the group appearing in a series of "Dead End Kids" films. He later appeared in an offshoot group of those films starring what were dubbed the "Little Tough Guys".  Punsly worked with well known stars such as Ronald Reagan, James Cagney, Pat O'Brien, John Garfield, and Humphrey Bogart in these films.

After acting
Even as an actor, Punsly was known to read medical books in his spare time. He joined the army after his last film, Mug Town, where he received medical training. He served in the Army Air Forces from March 1943 to March 1946. Upon discharge from the army, Punsly entered the Medical College of the University of Georgia, subsequently obtaining his medical degree in 1949. He returned to California and set up a medical practice in Torrance, never returning to show business.

He became chief of staff in the South Bay Hospital in Redondo Beach, California.

Personal life
Punsly married a woman named Lynne and had two children, Brian and Richard.

He died of cancer on January 20, 2004, at age 80, in a hospital in Torrance, California.

Filmography

References

External links
 
 

1923 births
2004 deaths
Deaths from cancer in California
Actors from Redondo Beach, California
20th-century American male actors
University of Georgia alumni
United States Army Air Forces soldiers